Shootin' Injuns is a 1925 American short silent comedy film directed by Robert F. McGowan. It was the 38th Our Gang short subject released.

Plot
The gang decides to run away from home and go shoot Indians, despite their parents' warnings. Traveling at night in the rain proves to be to eerie for the gang. They seek refuge into a nearby house, unaware that the home is actually an inventor's model for a gimmick-laden "magnetic house" in the process of being sold to an amusement park. The terrifying contrivances frighten the gang beyond their wits and they attempt to flee. Their parents eventually arrive to remedy the situation and end up getting involved with the gimmickry as well.

Cast

The Gang
 Mickey Daniels – Mickey, alias General Custer
 Jackie Condon – Jackie, alias Daniel Boone
 Joe Cobb – Joe, alias Sheriff "Buckshot" Joe
 Johnny Downs – Johnny, alias Davy Crockett
 Allen Hoskins – Farina, alias Pancho Farino
 Mary Kornman – Mary
 Eugene Jackson – Pineapple
 Pal the Dog – Himself

Additional cast
 Richard Daniels – W. R. Jones, inventor
 Jack Gavin – father
 William Gillespie – father
 "Tonnage" Martin Wolfkeil – Joe's father

References

External links

1925 films
American silent short films
American black-and-white films
1925 comedy films
1925 short films
Films directed by Robert F. McGowan
Hal Roach Studios short films
Our Gang films
1920s American films
Silent American comedy films
1920s English-language films